Lego Duplo (trademarked as DUPLO and stylized in the logo as duplo) is a core product range of the construction toy Lego by The LEGO Group, designed for children from  to 5 years old. Duplo bricks are twice the size of traditional Lego bricks, making them easier to handle and less likely to be swallowed by younger children. Despite their size, they are still compatible with traditional Lego bricks.

Initially launched in 1969, the Duplo range has expanded since then to include sets with figures, cars, houses, and trains. Duplo products are manufactured in Nyíregyháza, Hungary.

Development 
Before its introduction in 1969, The Lego Group investigated ways to produce safe, age-appropriate Lego bricks that were larger in size than traditional bricks in order to target young children aged one-and-a-half years and above. The company initially struggled to find a scale that would fit with the existing Lego System of Play, exploring 3:1 and 4:1 scales, but eventually settled on a 2:1 scale. In 1968, second generation owner Godtfred Kirk Christiansen provided the idea of hollowing out the studs on the Duplo bricks to make them compatible with the system. Duplo is derived from the Latin word for "duplex", meaning double.

Launch and release 

Duplo bricks were introduced in 1969, in four colors: red, yellow, blue, and white. The following year, two more sets were added with blue and red wheel plates. In the product catalog for 1971, the sets were described as being for children from 1 to 2 years, but were still sold mixed with Lego bricks, normally designed for ages 3 to 12. In 1972, the Duplo brick with two rows of two studs was introduced.

In 1975, Duplo became its own product brand, with five sets made up exclusively of Duplo bricks. New additions included a round-topped two-by-two stud brick and a small four-wheeled wagon with two rows of six studs. With these new Duplo sets, Lego began targeting children  years old with the intention that when the children became older, their Duplo bricks could be used together with regular Lego bricks.

In 1977, the Duplo name was dropped in favor of Lego Preschool. Small figures the size of two-by-two bricks were introduced, made up of a cylindrical head and a tapered, limbless body, similar in design to Fisher-Price's Little People. Another new brick was a half arch. The new sets included figures, doors, and two-by-six brick wagons that could act as a car or train.

The name Duplo was brought back in 1979, along with a new reworked logo. Some brick sets were sold inside a plush version of the rabbit from the logo, that zipped closed.

In 1983, other Duplo figures appeared, often called Duplo people. These figures have a moveable head, arms, and legs and look like large Lego minifigures, but cannot be taken apart, making them safer for small children. Also in 1983, set number 2700 was introduced with a model of a steam engine with two train cars. In 1986, a Duplo doll house with sliding doors was introduced. This included a Duplo people mother, father, and smaller child.

In 1992, Duplo Toolo was introduced, which was a range of construction sets using screw drivers and was aimed at children between the ages of three and six.

1993 brought a grey rail train system with a stop and start track. Later, two more train systems arrived.  In 2005, Lego started selling Duplo trains themed as Thomas the Tank Engine.

In 1995, Duplo Primo was launched, which was a line aimed at children aged between 6 and 24 months. Most of the products in this line were not construction toys. Duplo Primo was later renamed Lego Primo.

The name Duplo was dropped again in favour of Explore in 2002. The new brand name was used to emphasise the relationship between the bricks and the child's learning. Explore introduced four different ways of exploring play: explore being me; explore together; explore imagination and explore logic. In the 2004 spring catalog, there was a reminder that Duplo was now called Explore, but that fall the well-known Duplo name was back yet again with a new rabbit logo designed to match the new elephant logo for the Lego Quatro range.

Lego have made Duplo sets licensed with Bob the Builder and Thomas & Friends characters. Those Duplo ranges have been discontinued, but Duplo sets now include farm, zoo, town, castle, and pirate lines. A doll house and princess castle are available as of 2008. Some Duplo sets have cars, trucks, and buildings which cannot be disassembled. Some DUPLO sets do not include building manuals.

Production 
Lego Duplo is manufactured at a factory in Nyíregyháza, Hungary. Over 90% of all Duplo elements are manufactured at the plant, alongside traditional Lego bricks. Csaba Tóth, Communications Director, commented, "Every year, about 14 million Duplo boxes come out of the Nyíregyháza factory. For this, we inject 2 million Duplo cubes and Duplo parts a day".

Other media
In 1995, Lego Duplo was the sponsor of the British children's pre-school television series Tots TV on CITV.

In 2014, Lego Duplo made an appearance in The Lego Movie, as aliens built from Duplo bricks that threaten the citizens of Bricksburg. They reappear in the 2019 sequel, The Lego Movie 2: The Second Part, as the same alien invaders, with the story picking up from the events of the previous film.

Theme park attraction
In March 2020, a new theme park attraction was announced at Legoland Windsor Resort. The Duplo Dino Coaster was introduced as part of Duplo Valley, an area of the park designed for children aged five and under. The area also includes Duplo Valley Airport, which involves fully controllable helicopters.

Reception
In October 2019, Lego Duplo World was launched, which is an educational games app that was designed to help children between the ages of two and five reach their key learning goals. It was developed by StoryToys in partnership with The Lego Group. The app has won several awards, including a 2020 Licensing International Award, a 2020 KAPI award at the Consumer Electronics Show in Las Vegas, a 2021 Notable Children's Digital Media award from the American Library Association and a 2021 Kidscreen Award for best learning app (branded).

Awards and nominations 
In 2009, Feeding Zoo (set number: 5634) was awarded "DreamToys" in the Construction category by the Toy Retailers Association.

In 2019, Submarine Adventure! (set number: 10910) was awarded "DreamToys" in the Trains, Planes and Automobiles category by the Toy Retailers Association.

See also 

 Lego Juniors

References

External links 
 Duplo at Lego.com

Lego products
Construction toys
Products introduced in 1969

de:Lego#Duplo